Thomas Hefti is a politician from Switzerland who served as President of the Swiss Council of States from 2021 to 2022 and Member of the Swiss Council of States from 2014.

References 

Presidents of the Council of States (Switzerland)